Helenius de Cock (1 November 1824, Eppenhuizen – 2 January 1894) was an instructor at the Theological School in Kampen, Overijssel, the Netherlands.

He was the son of Hendrik de Cock and Frouwe Venema.

References

1824 births
1844 deaths
People from Eemsmond
Reformed Churches Christians from the Netherlands
Dutch Calvinist and Reformed theologians
19th-century Calvinist and Reformed theologians